Phú Yên is a coastal province in the South Central Coast of Vietnam. It is the easternmost province of Vietnam's mainland.

Geography
Phú Yên borders Bình Định province to the north, Khánh Hòa province to the south, Đắk Lắk province to the southwest, and Gia Lai province to the northwest. Phú Yên contains two passes: Cù Mông pass in the north and Cả pass in the south.

The province's topography consists of hilly regions in the west (70%) and the fertile plain of Tuy Hòa in the east. Lowlands also extend west along Đà Rằng River. The highest peaks are at 1,592 m on the border of Khánh Hòa province in the south and at 1,331 m in the northwest (Đồng Xuân District). There are several hills near the coast, including Mô Cheo (Núi Mô Cheo, 814 m) in Sông Cầu and Đá Bia (Núi Đá Bia, 706 m) near Đại Lãnh in Đông Hòa District.

The main rivers that flow across Phú Yên are the Đà Rằng River (the largest river in Central Vietnam), Bàn Thạch River and Kỳ Lộ River. Sông Hinh Lake, a large artificial lake, is located in the southwest of the province.

Phú Yên has various picturesque landscapes, such as the Ô Loan Lagoon, Sông Cầu coconut ranges, Đá Bia and Nhạn mountains, Rô Bay, Xep Beach, and Long Thủy Beach.

The beautiful nature of Phú Yên has been used for the movie Yellow Flowers on the Green Grass, which is adapted from the same novel by Nguyễn Nhật Ánh.

Administrative divisions
Phú Yên is subdivided into nine district-level sub-divisions:

 6 districts:

 Đồng Xuân
 Phú Hòa
 Sơn Hòa
 Sông Hinh
 Tây Hòa
 Tuy An

 2 district-level towns:
 Đông Hòa
 Sông Cầu
 1 provincial city:
 Tuy Hòa (capital)

They are further subdivided into eight commune-level towns (or townlets), 88 communes, and 16 wards.

Demography
As of 2007 Phú Yên has a population of 880,700. It has a relatively small urban population (178,600), making up 20% of the province's population. With 174 people per square kilometer, it is also one of the least densely populated provinces of the South Central Coast. Population density is relatively high (exceeding 500/km2) along the lower Đà Rằng River, but is lower than 50/km2 in much of the western part of the province. Average yearly population growth between 2000 and 2007 has been 1.3%, close to the regional average. Urban population growth has been faster with 2.2% per year on average.

The vast majority of the population is ethnic Kinh. There are also minorities of Cham, E De, and Ba Na people. Significant minorities of Cham live in Đồng Xuân District and Sơn Hòa District and E De people in Sông Hinh District and Sơn Hòa District. Much smaller communities of Ba Na people also live in these three districts.

Economy
With a GDP per capita of 8.43 million VND in 2007 and a relatively small industrial sector, Phú Yên is one of the less developed provinces of the South Central Coast.

Phú Yên has had a trade deficit. In 2007, it exported goods worth US$72.7 million while importing goods worth US$116.25 million, mainly fuel, raw materials, machinery, and medical goods.

Total employment was at 482,800 in 2007. The vast majority (361,400) are still employed in agriculture, forestry, and fishing. 45,600 people were employed in industry and construction and 75,800 in the service sector. Both industry and service have shown little employment growth between 2005 and 2007. Service employment has actually declined significantly since 2000.

Agriculture, forestry and fishing
The main agricultural regions of the province are the plains around Tuy Hòa and the lowlands along the Đà Rằng River. In 2007 the rice harvest was 321,800 t. It is the South Central Coast's largest producer of sugar-cane with a harvest of 1.051 million t (6% of Vietnam's total harvest). Cultivation of cotton and tobacco is also significant, with 800 t (5% of the national total) and 700 t (2.2%) respectively. Other crops include peanuts, cashew nuts, pepper, and coffee.

Phú Yên has a relatively large fishing sector. Its gross output is the third largest in the South Central Coast after Khánh Hòa province and Bình Định province. Aquaculture, mostly shrimp farms, make up around one third of the fishing output, while using 2300 ha.

Industry
Phú Yên is one of the less industrialized provinces of the South Central Coast. Its industrial production is mostly based on the processing of local primary products such as fish, shrimp, cashew nuts and sugar. The province also produces mineral water, beer, garments, and cement. Industrial parks are located in the north of Tuy Hòa and Sông Cầu, near Qui Nhơn.

The province is zoning and developing a large economic zone, namely the Nam Phú Yên Economic Zone in southern Đông Hòa District. Upon completion, it will become an oil-refining hub in Vietnam and potentially provide high profits for the province.

Infrastructure

Transport
National Route 1 as well as the North–South Railway run through the province. Phú Yên's main railway station is Tuy Hòa Railway Station. Smaller railway stations are located in Đồng Xuân District and Tuy An District north of Tuy Hòa. National Road 25 connects Tuy Hòa to Chư Sê in Gia Lai province, mostly along the Đà Rằng River.

Đông Tác Airport, a small domestic airport, is located south of Tuy Hòa.

The province has a port around 28 km south of Tuy Hòa, namely Vũng Rô Port.

Energy
A hydropower plant is located in Sông Hinh District in the southwest of Phú Yên. It is built on the Hinh River, a major tributary of the Đà Rằng River and which created a lake of the same name (Sông Hinh Lake, meaning River Hinh Lake). Phú Yên produced 379.9 million kWh of electricity in 2007.

References

External links
 Official website of the Phú Yên province People's Committee

 
Provinces of Vietnam